Ratu Leone Rotuisolia (born 21 February 1998) is a Fijian rugby union player, currently playing for the . His preferred position is lock.

Professional career
Rotuisolia was named in the Fijian Drua squad for the 2022 Super Rugby Pacific season.

References

External links

1998 births
Living people
Fijian rugby union players
Rugby union locks
Fijian Drua players
Fiji international rugby union players